State Highway 5 (SH 5) is a state highway in Jharkhand, India.

Route
SH 5 originates at Chaibasa and passes through Saraikela and Kandra and terminates at its junction with National Highway 43 at Chowka.

The total length of SH 5 is 68.70 km.

Road improvements
The entire highway is being improved. The Manikui bridge, across the Subarnarekha, which had collapsed in 2013 has been rebuilt.

References

State Highways in Jharkhand